Peter Mark is an Irish hairdressing chain founded in June 1961 by brothers Peter and Mark Keaveney. The first shop they opened was in Dublin's Grafton Street. They currently have 69 shops in the island of Ireland. The company train and recruit their own staff in training schools based in Dublin and Belfast.

In 2019 their profits were reported to have increased. Following the 2020 Coronavirus pandemic, they increased prices and closed one branch.

References

External links
Peter Mark homepage

Hairdressers
Retail companies established in 1961
1961 establishments in Ireland